Dalian Bay, known historically as Talienwan,  Talien-wan and Talien-hwan, is a bay on the southeast side of the Liaodong Peninsula of Northeast China, open to the Korea Bay in the Yellow Sea in the east. Downtown Dalian lies along the southern shore of the bay. Its significance is that it is ice-free year-round, while Jinzhou Bay on the other, northwest side of the peninsula is part of the Bohai Sea, and is shallow and closed by ice for four months of the winter.

The bay was the rendezvous point for the British fleet for the 1860 assault on China during the Second Opium War, which resulted in the naming of the naval fortress Port Arthur (now Lüshunkou District, Dalian). In 1879, about 20 small islands with their bays around Dalian were named Dalian Bay and barbettes for military use were built after that. By the end of the First Sino-Japanese War of 1894–1895, most of the barbettes were discarded and a fishery industry started quickly. Now only six barbettes remain, and they are located on the Monk Island. They were built between 1887 and 1893.

The lease was transferred to Japan in 1905 following the Russo-Japanese War.

Today, Dalian Bay has one of the biggest fishing ports in East Asia and it plays an essential role in the Chinese fishery industry. It has been a famous seafood distribution center since the 1930s, with thousands of people involved in commercial fishing coming to Dalian Bay for various transactions.

See also
 Port of Dalian

References

Bays of China
Bodies of water of Liaoning
Dalian
Bodies of water of the Yellow Sea